Ptocheuusa cuprimarginella is a moth of the family Gelechiidae. It was described by Pierre Chrétien in 1915. It is found in Algeria.

The wingspan is about 10.5 mm. The forewings are grey with a violet hue. The hindwings are grey.

References

Moths described in 1915
Ptocheuusa